Jaque mate or Jaque Mate may refer to:

 "Jaque mate", Spanish for Checkmate in chess
 Jaque Mate (wrestler), born Jaime Álvarez Mendoza in 1948
 Jaque Mate (film), a 2011 Dominican drama

See also
 Checkmate (disambiguation)